Robert Lee "Chan" Romero (born July 7, 1941) is an American rock and roll performer, best known for his 1959 song, "Hippy Hippy Shake".

Life and career
Romero was born in Billings, Montana. His father was of Spanish and Apache descent, while his mother was a mixture of Mexican, Cherokee and Irish. Both had migrated to Montana during the Great Depression, seeking employment as migrant farm workers.  The nickname "Chan" was bestowed on Romero by his grandfather.  Since Romero often ran around without footwear, the nickname, from a Spanish phrase meaning "little boy with pig's feet" seemed appropriate.

Romero said Elvis Presley's 1956 performance of "Hound Dog" on The Steve Allen Show was a turning point in his life. He hitchhiked to East Los Angeles, California in 1958 while still a teenager, where he wrote Hippy Hippy Shake and launched his career. An uncle introduced Romero and his music to an A&R representative from Specialty Records: Sonny Bono.  Bono was particularly taken with a song called "My Little Ruby" and asked Romero to polish the song and to return in a few weeks. But since Romero needed to return to school in Montana, he never returned to Specialty.

Romero's career skyrocketed with the release of "Hippy Hippy Shake" in July 1959.  Released first in the United States and later in Australia and in the UK, it soon came to the attention of Paul McCartney who liked the song and sang it at the Cavern Club in Liverpool and the Star Club in Hamburg during his early years with The Beatles.  The 1964 version by The Swinging Blue Jeans hit number one across Europe.

Romero's work bore a resemblance to that of Ritchie Valens, and the two ended up on the same record label. After Valens died in a plane crash, Romero was introduced to Richie Valens' grieving mother, with whom Romero became close. Her home served as Romero's home during his visits to Los Angeles; he slept in Valens' bedroom. He remains close to the Valens family and has performed at the Ritchie Valens memorial concert held yearly in Pacoima, California.

Romero's first visit to Palm Springs, California in 1964 inspired him to make the area his home.  He still lives in the area and divides his time between Palm Springs and Billings.

References

External links

Biography of Chan Romero by Mark Guerrero, son of Chicano music pioneer Lalo Guerrero
Chan Romero page at rockabillyhall.com
Chan Romero Discography at Discogs.com
Chan Romero Interview - NAMM Oral History Library (2016)

American singer-songwriters
American musicians of Mexican descent
American male singer-songwriters
Challenge Records artists
People from Billings, Montana
1941 births
Living people
Songwriters from Montana
Del-Fi Records artists
Hispanic and Latino American musicians